Tarján is a Hungarian language name, derived from an old Turkic title Tarkhan, meaning viceroy or prince. It may refer to:

Places
Tarján, Hungary

People with the surname
James Tarjan (1952), American chess grandmaster
Robert Tarjan (1948), American computer scientist

See also
Tarcan (disambiguation)
Tarkan (disambiguation)

Hungarian-language surnames